Horatio Hartley (1826–1903) was an American gold prospector who participated in the Otago Gold Rush in New Zealand in the 1860s. He was born in the United States.

In 1862, Hartley discovered gold near Clutha River with Christopher Reilly. The location was proclaimed as the Dunstan goldfield on September 23, 1862.

Hartley died in San Francisco in 1903.

References

1826 births
1903 deaths
New Zealand gold prospectors
American emigrants to New Zealand
New Zealand people of American descent
People of the Otago Gold Rush